Yamaha AS1 is a 125 cc two-stroke air-cooled motorcycle produced by Yamaha, between 1967 and 1970.

References

AS1